Ramon Klenz (born 2 August 1998) is a German swimmer. He competed in the men's 200 metre butterfly event at the 2018 FINA World Swimming Championships (25 m), in Hangzhou, China. Ramon currently swim under club coach Matt Magee at ONEflow Aquatics in Neckarsulm, Germany.

References

1998 births
Living people
German male swimmers
German male butterfly swimmers
Place of birth missing (living people)